Peter Richard "Spider" Stacy (born 14 December 1958, Eastbourne) is an English musician, singer, songwriter, and actor. He is best known for playing tin whistle and sometimes singing for The Pogues.

Early life

Stacy left school at 16 after failing to attend regularly, and had a few jobs, including working at a carwash and as a used car salesman for nearly two years.

The Pogues

Stacy co-founded The Pogues, along with Shane MacGowan, Jem Finer, and James Fearnley, and appeared on all of their recordings. He is credited with suggesting the band's original name, Pogue Mahone (the actual Irish spelling being "póg mo thóin"), which is Irish for "kiss my arse." The band's original intent was for MacGowan and Stacy to share vocal duties, but Stacy decided to leave them to Shane after the first performance, opting to learn the tin whistle. Stacy still frequently contributed backing vocals and occasional lead vocals throughout his long tenure with the band. In addition, he is known for sometimes banging a pub tray against his head for percussive effect. After Shane MacGowan was fired from The Pogues in 1991, Joe Strummer filled in for him for a short period, after which Stacy assumed the role of lead vocalist. The Pogues recorded two albums with Stacy on lead vocals: Waiting for Herb and Pogue Mahone. Stacy resumed his original role in the band since they began performing reunion shows in 2001.

Other appearances

After the Pogues' break-up, Stacy briefly formed a new band, Wisemen—soon renamed The Vendettas—which included ex-Pogues Andrew Ranken and Darryl Hunt (as well as Kavus Torabi of The Monsoon Bassoon, Cardiacs and Gong). Stacy has appeared in both live performances and on recordings with many fellow musicians, including Astral Social Club, Filthy Thievin' Bastards, and longtime friend Steve Earle. In 2005, Stacy performed two songs, including "Joe Hill," with Patti Smith at the Meltdown festival. In 2007, he appeared on The Dropkick Murphys' version of "Flannigan's Ball" with Ronnie Drew of The Dubliners.

In 2015 Stacy teamed up with Cajun music band Lost Bayou Ramblers to perform Pogues songs under the name Poguetry in Motion, later shortened to Poguetry. In 2018, he was joined by original Pogues bassist Cait O'Riordan. In February and March 2020 Poguetry played an eight-date tour of the US.

Acting

Stacy has appeared in several movies and television productions over his career, including the Alex Cox films Straight to Hell (1986) and Walker (1986), as well as Eat the Rich (1987). Most recently, he appeared as "Slim Jim" Lynch in two seasons of the HBO series Treme. The series, which is set in New Orleans, was co-created by The Wire creator David Simon. Several Pogues songs had been featured on The Wire, and Stacy was introduced to both Simon and The Wire/Treme writer and novelist George Pelecanos backstage after a Pogues performance in D.C. Stacy's friendship with Pelecanos later led to a 2009 performance featuring him and The Pogues at The Boogaloo, a London pub. Pelecanos read excerpts from his new novel, The Way Home, followed by The Pogues' first pub performance since 1983.

Personal life
In 2010, Stacy and his wife Louise purchased a home in New Orleans, where they currently live.

References

1958 births
Living people
The Pogues members
Tin whistle players
English rock singers
People from Eastbourne